The 7th CBRN Defense Regiment "Cremona" is a field artillery regiment of the Italian Army, specializing in CBRN defense. Originally a unit of the army's artillery arm the regiment reformed as 7th NBC Defense Regiment "Cremona" on 31 December 1998 and is since then designated as a multi-arms unit. Today the regiment is based in Civitavecchia in Lazio and administratively assigned to the Artillery Command.

Current Structure
As of 2019 the 7th CBRN Defense Regiment "Cremona" consists of:

  Regimental Command, in Civitavecchia
 Command and Logistic Support Company
 CBRN Defense Battalion
 1st CBRN Defense Company
 2nd CBRN Defense Company
 3rd CBRN Defense Company
 4th CBRN Defense Company
 5th CBRN Defense Company

The Command and Logistic Support Company fields the following platoons: C3 Platoon, Transport and Materiel Platoon, Medical Platoon, and Commissariat Platoon. The regiment is equipped with VAB armoured personnel carriers in the CBRN configuration.

External links
Italian Army Website: 7° Reggimento Difesa CBRN "Cremona"

References

Artillery Regiments of Italy